The following is a list of notable deaths in July 1994.

Entries for each day are listed alphabetically by surname. A typical entry lists information in the following sequence:
 Name, age, country of citizenship at birth, subsequent country of citizenship (if applicable), reason for notability, cause of death (if known), and reference.

July 1994

1
Markus Barth, 78, Swiss scholar of theology.
George Cannon, 62, Canadian pro wrestler and wrestling manager, cancer.
Helena Grossówna, 89, Polish actress and dancer.
Asif Maharammov, 41, Azerbaijani lieutenant colonel, tuberculosis.

2
Lucio Amelio, 62, Italian art dealer, curator, and actor.
Roberto Balado, 25, Cuban amateur boxer and Olympic champion, railway accident.
Andrés Escobar, 27, Colombian football player, homicide.
Maung Maung, 69, President of Burma and writer, heart attack.
Ralph Rinzler, 59, American mandolin player, folksinger, and festival organizer.
Marion Williams, 66, American gospel singer.

3
Zelma Watson George, 90, American opera singer and philanthropist.
Lew Hoad, 59, Australian tennis player, leukemia.
Felix Kelly, 80, New Zealand-British graphic designer, painter, stage designer, and illustrator.
John Aloysius Marshall, 66, American prelate of the Catholic Church.
Petey Sarron, 87, American boxer.
Héctor Xavier, 73, Mexican sketch artist.

4
Almiro Bergamo, 81, Italian rower and Olympian.
Stevan Dohanos, 87, American artist and illustrator, pneumonia.
Alfred Harvey, 80, American comic book publisher and comic book character creator (Richie Rich, Little Dot).
Joey Marella, 31, American professional wrestling referee, traffic collision.
Gerard C. Smith, 80, American attorney and defense expert.
Hedda Zinner, 90, German actress, comedian, journalist and radio director.

5
Vaikom Muhammad Basheer, 86, Indian independence activist and writer .
Charles Comfort, 93, Scottish-Canadian painter, sculptor, and writer.
Ju Do-il, 72, North Korean army officer, politician and the personal guard of Kim Il-sung.
Mammadali Huseynov, 72, Azerbaijani/Soviet archaeologist.
Lennart Klingström, 78, Swedish sprint canoeist and Olympian.
Tawfiq Ziad, 65, Palestinian Israeli politician, traffic collision.

6
Alfonso Casasempere, 84, Chilean swimmer and Olympian.
Geoff McQueen, 46, British television screenwriter, aneurysm.
Cameron Mitchell, 75, American actor (Death of a Salesman, How to Marry a Millionaire, The High Chaparral), lung cancer.
Baruch Osnia, 88, Israeli politician.
Jim Stott, 74, English rugby player.

7
Aaron Antonovsky, 70, Israeli-American sociologist and academic.
Carlo Chiti, 69, Italian racing car and engine designer.
Anita Garvin, 88, American stage performer and film actress.
Friedrich August Freiherr von der Heydte, 87, German paratroop officer during World War II and academic.
Anna Kostrova, 84, Soviet/Russian painter, graphic artist, and book illustrator.
John S.R. Shad, 71, American diplomat and ambassador.
Ka. Mu. Sheriff, 79, Indian writer and poet.

8
Christian-Jaque, 89, French filmmaker, heart attack.
Robert B. Hauser, 75, American cinematographer.
Kim Il-sung, 82, Founder and first leader of North Korea, heart attack.
Robert Edwin Lee, 75, American playwright and lyricist.
Lars-Eric Lindblad, 67, Swedish-American entrepreneur and explorer.
José García Narezo, 71, Mexican painter.
Dick Sargent, 64, American actor (Bewitched, Operation Petticoat, Down to Earth), prostate cancer.

9
Trevor King, 41, British Ulster loyalist and UVF member.
Sabby Lewis, 79, American jazz pianist, band leader, and arranger.
Bill Mosienko, 72, Ukrainian Canadian ice hockey player.
Paul M. Naghdi, 70, Irani-American engineer, lung cancer.
Surendra Nath, 68, Indian politician and Governor of Punjab.
W. L. Warren, 64, British historian and medievalist.

10
Lélia Gonzalez, 59, Brazilian politician, anthropologist and human rights activist.
André Joseph Guillaume Henri Kostermans, 88, Indonesian botanist.
Robert Mellin, 91, Ukrainian-American composer, lyricist and music publisher.
Earl Strom, 66, American National Basketball Association referee, brain cancer.

11
Lex Humphries, 57, American jazz drummer.
Gary Kildall, 52, American computer scientist and microcomputer entrepreneur, injury.
Rama Raghoba Rane, 76, Indian Army officer.
Savannah, 23, American pornographic film actress, suicide.

12
Elder Paisios of Mount Athos, 69, Greek Eastern Orthodox monk, cancer.
James Joll, 76, British historian.
Irena Krzywicka, 95, Polish feminist, writer, and women's rights activist .
David Malcolm Lewis, 66, English historian.
Wal-Berg, 83, French composer and conductor.

13
Eddie Boyd, 79, American blues pianist, singer and songwriter.
Anita Bärwirth, 75, German gymnast.
Gerry Couture, 68, Canadian ice hockey player.
John Kramer, 59, Danish football player.
Juozas Miltinis, 86, Lithuanian actor and theatre director.
Jimmie Reese, 92, American Major League Baseball player.
Murray Tyrrell, 80, Australian public servant.
Marik Vos-Lundh, 71, Swedish costume designer.
Olin Chaddock Wilson, 85, American astronomer.

14
Robert Jungk, 81, Austrian writer, journalist, historian and pacifist.
Eric Linden, 84, American actor.
Alberto Lionello, 64, Italian film actor, singer and presenter, cancer.
Jeanne Bieruma Oosting, 96, Dutch engraver, visual artist, and book designer.
César Tovar, 54, Venezuelan baseball player, pancreatic cancer.

15
Patricio Carvajal, 77, Chilean admiral and member of the military dictatorship, suicide.
Harald Molander, 84, Swedish film producer.
Mona Rico, 87, Mexican-American actress.
William Walters, 86, South African athlete and Olympian.

16
Madzy Rollin Couquerque, 91, Dutch hockey- and tennis player.
Robert Médus, 65, French rugby union and rugby league football player.
William Revelli, 92, American conductor.
Julian Schwinger, 76, American theoretical physicist and Nobel Prize laureate, pancreatic cancer.

17
Sutan Takdir Alisjahbana, 86, Indonesian novelist and poet.
Krešimir Arapović, 69, Croatian football player and manager.
Jean Borotra, 95, French tennis champion.
Harry Harris, 74, British-American biochemist and geneticist.
Horrie Gorringe, 99, Australian rules football player.
Billy Hillenbrand, 72, American gridiron football player.
Henry Maier, 76, American politician, pneumonia.
Jerry Mays, 54, American gridiron football player, melanoma.
Enrique San Pedro, 66, Cuban-American Roman Catholic bishop and missionary.
Gozo Shioda, 78, Japanese master of aikido.

18
Predrag Golubović, 59, Serbian film director and screenwriter.
Merle Hapes, 75, American gridiron football player.
Leonas Petrauskas, 75, Lithuanian basketball player.
Jens Scheer, 59, German  physicist and anti-nuclear activist.
Michele Zaza, 49, Italian member of the Camorra criminal organisation, heart attack.

19
Eilís Dillon, 74, Irish author.
Rudolf Firkušný, 82, Moravian-American classical pianist.
Ray Flaherty, 90, American NBA football player and coach.
Ernst Müller-Hermann, 78, German politician.
Andy Penman, 51, Scottish football player.
Gottfried Reinhardt, 81, Austrian-American film director and producer, pancreatic cancer.
W. L. Warren, 64, British historian and medievalist .
Han Xu, 70, Chinese diplomat.

20
Paul Delvaux, 96, Belgian painter.
Patrick J. Hillings, 71, American politician.
Suzanne Juyol, 74, French opera soprano.
Laila Shahzada, 68, Pakistani abstract painter, killed in gas explosion.
Choi Yung-keun, 71, South Korean football player.

21
Pere Calders, 80, Spanish writer and cartoonist.
Dorothy Collins, 67, Canadian-American singer, actress, and recording artist, asthma.
John Ernest, 72, American abstract artist.
Clarissa Kaye, 63, Australian actress, cancer.
Charles Lynch, 74, Canadian journalist and author.
Marijac, 85, French comics writer, artist, and editor.
Henri Mouillefarine, 83, French cyclist.
Hugh Scott, 93, American lawyer and politician, heart attack.

22
Colin Cole, 78, English cricket player.
Jack Harrold, 74, American opera singer.
Jim Healy, 70, American sports commentator, complications of liver cancer.
Alexandre Hogue, 96, American artist.

23
Eva Bacon, 85, Austrian-Australian activist and feminist.
Mario Brega, 71, Italian actor, heart attack.
Umberto Cerati, 83, Italian long-distance runner and Olympian.
Hans J. Salter, 98, Austrian-American film composer (A Fistful of Dollars, For a Few Dollars More, The Good, the Bad and the Ugly).
Lennox Sebe, 67, President of Ciskei.
John Marlow Thompson, 79, British RAF officer and flying ace during World War II.

24
Leo Brongersma, 87, Dutch zoologist, herpetologist, and author.
Helen Cordero, 79, American Cochiti Pueblo potter.
Utaro Hashimoto, 87, Japanese 9-dan Go player.
Robert Wangila, 26, Kenyan boxer and Olympic champion, injuries sustained during boxing match.

25
Walter Baxter, 79, English novelist.
Gerald Eades Bentley, 92, American academic and literary scholar.
Jack Clemo, 78, British poet and writer.
David Regan, 55, British academic, suicide.
William E. Schevill, 88, American paleontologist.

26
James Luther Adams, 92, American theologian.
Roland Gladu, 83, Canadian baseball third baseman.
Christy Henrich, 22, American artistic gymnast, anorexia nervosa.
W. Dorr Legg, 89, American landscape architect gay rights activist.
Tonia Marketaki, 51, Greek film director and screenwriter.
Ernst Schröder, 79, German actor, suicide.
Terry Scott, 67, English actor and comedian, cancer.
Junnosuke Yoshiyuki, 70, Japanese novelist and short-story writer, liver cancer.

27
Kevin Carter, 33, South African photojournalist and Pulitzer Prize winner, suicide.
Rosa Chacel, 96, Spanish writer.
Irving Folwartshny, 80, American hammer thrower and weight thrower.
Eduard Kolmanovsky, 71, Soviet/Russian composer.
Howie Livingston, 72, American gridiron football player.
Tai Solarin, 71, Nigerian educator and author.

28
Bernard Delfont, 84, Russian-British theatrical impresario.
Arthur Holt, 83, British cricket player.
Alfred Phillips, 86, Canadian diver and Olympian.
Erwin Ringel, 73, Austrian psychiatrist and neurologist.
Colin Turnbull, 69, British-American anthropologist, AIDS-related complications.
Munawwaruz Zaman, 44, Pakistani field hockey player, heart atack.

29
Grigol Abashidze, 79, Georgian poet.
John Britton, 69, American physician, homicide.
Dorothy Hodgkin, 84, British chemist and Nobel Prize laureate, cerebral hemorrhage.
Mussum, 53, Brazilian actor and musician, cardiovascular disease.
Paul Francis Tanner, 89, American Roman Catholic bishop.

30
John Barnabas, 64, Indian evolutionary biologist.
Janis Carter, 80, American actress, heart attack.
Lionel Deraniyagala, 53, Sri Lankan actor.
Konstantin Kalser, 73, German-American film producer and advertising executive.
Derek Raymond, 63, English crime writer.
Ryszard Riedel, 37, Polish singer and songwriter.
Theo van Scheltinga, 80, Dutch chess player.

31
Joe Bratty, 33, Northern Irish loyalist paramilitary, shot by the IRA.
Raymond Elder, 32, Northern Irish loyalist paramilitary, shot by the IRA.
Carlos A. Santos-Viola, 82, Filipino architect .
Anne Shelton, 70, English vocalist, heart attack.
Caitlin Thomas, 80, English author and the wife of writer Dylan Thomas.

References 

1994-07
 07